A Type 094 nuclear submarine belonging to China is thought to have suffered a release of radioactivity in July 2011. Media coverage of the event has been banned, leading to international concern over the handling of the crisis. The Chinese government denies any radiation leak has occurred.

The event
On 29 July 2011 a release of radioactivity is thought to have taken place on board an 8,000-ton Type 094 Jin-class nuclear-powered ballistic missile submarine, docked in Dalian. According to reports, China Era Electronics Corporation was installing an electronic system when the leak occurred.

International reaction
South Korea has demanded that China clarify the situation and stop trying to cover up the event. The conservative Chosun Ilbo newspaper stated that the "Chinese authorities must waste no time in providing Korea with credible information."

See also
List of Chinese military accidents

References

Type 094 accident
July 2011 events in China
Maritime incidents in 2011